Diaulula greeleyi is a species of sea slug or dorid nudibranch, a marine gastropod mollusc in the family Discodorididae.

Distribution
Distribution of Diaulula greeleyi include Rio de Janeiro State, southeastern Brazil.

Description
The maximum recorded body length is 47 mm.

Ecology
Minimum recorded depth is 0 m. Maximum recorded depth is 2 m.

Prey of Diaulula greeleyi include sponges Lissondendoryx isodictialis and Haliclona sp.

References

External links

Discodorididae
Gastropods described in 1909